List of hospitals in South Carolina (U.S. state), sorted by hospital name.

References

External links 
Hospitals Licensed by the State of South Carolina

South Carolina

Hospitals